Elizabeth Benjamin is an American television writer and producer.

Benjamin has worked on the series Law & Order: Criminal Intent, Bones, Crash, UnReal, 13 Reasons Why, The Man In The High Castle , Dead To Me and The Flight Attendant.

A former modern dancer, Benjamin has danced for a number of choreographers including Molissa Fenley, David Parsons, & Twyla Tharp.

Awards
 Edgar Allan Poe Award for Best Television Teleplay for Law & Order: Criminal Intent "Want."
 Best Writing Short Film, Didactic Encounter, Williamsburg, Brooklyn Film Festival.
 Gold Ogle Award for, "The Field," Best Fantasy/Horror/Mystery Audio Production of the Year presented by the American Society for Science Fiction Audio and the Minnesota Society for Interest in Science Fiction and Fantasy.

Filmography

References

External links
 
 

American television producers
American women television producers
American television writers
Living people
American women television writers
Place of birth missing (living people)
Year of birth missing (living people)
American women screenwriters
21st-century American women